Kliewer is a surname. Notable people with the surname include:

Cliff Kliewer (1927–1987), Canadian football player
Steven Kliewer, American biochemist

Russian Mennonite surnames